Class 319 may refer to:

British Rail Class 319
Renfe Class 319